Benjamin Helander (born 28 September 1998) is a Finnish handball player for Rhein-Neckar Löwen and the Finnish national team.

Career 
He moved to Sweden when he was 16 years old to attend a handball school, and at the same time started playing for the club Alingsås HK's younger team, playing in the third league division. Because of military service, he moved back to Finland for a year in 2017/18. After that he went back to Alingsås HK, this time in Handbollsligan.

In 2021 it was announced that he's signed a contract with the German club Rhein-Neckar Löwen.

Personal life 
He is the younger brother of javelin thrower and previous handball player Oliver Helander.

References

1998 births
Living people
Finnish male handball players
Rhein-Neckar Löwen players
Handball-Bundesliga players